Old-fashioned Tricks is a 1986 Soviet comedy film directed by Aleksandr Pankratov.

Plot 
The retired hussar wants to marry his son to the daughter of the landowner. But it was not so simple.

Cast 
 Darya Mikhaylova		
 Vladimir Samoilov
 Nikolay Trofimov
 Mikhail Kononov
 Aleksey Nesterenko
 Boris Bachurin		
 Valentin Golubenko
 Gleb Plaksin
 Mariya Shashkova
 Tatyana Shashkova

References

External links 
 

1986 films
1980s Russian-language films
Soviet comedy films
1986 comedy films